Decatur County is a county in the U.S. state of Indiana. As of the 2020 United States Census, the population was 26,472. The county seat (and only incorporated city) is Greensburg.

History
In 1787, the US defined the Northwest Territory which included the area of present-day Indiana. In 1800, Congress separated Ohio from the Northwest Territory, designating the rest of the land as the Indiana Territory. President Thomas Jefferson chose William Henry Harrison as the governor of the territory, and Vincennes was established as the capital. After the Michigan Territory was separated and the Illinois Territory was formed, Indiana was reduced to its current size and geography. By December 1816 the Indiana Territory was admitted to the Union as a state.

Starting in 1794, Native American titles to Indiana lands were extinguished by usurpation, purchase, or war and treaty. The United States acquired land from the Native Americans in the 1809 treaty of Fort Wayne, and by the treaty of St. Mary's in 1818 considerably more territory became property of the government. This included the future Decatur County, which was authorized by the state legislature on 12 December 1821. No settler was allowed in the area until the government survey was completed in 1820.

The Decatur County governing structure was formed in 1822. The county was named for Commodore Stephen Decatur, Jr., naval officer in the First and Second Barbary Wars, and in the War of 1812. Decatur was killed in a duel in 1820.

Geography
The low rolling hills are devoted to agriculture or urban development, with only the areas carved by drainages still wooded. The highest point ( ASL) is a hillock  SSE from Kingston.
The Flatrock River flows westward through the upper part of the county, continuing into Shelby County. Clifty Creek flows southwestward through the central part of the county, continuing into Bartholomew, and Sand Creek flows south-southwestward through the lower center of the county, continuing into Jennings County.

Adjacent counties
 Rush County – north
 Franklin County – east
 Ripley County – southeast
 Jennings County – south
 Bartholomew County – west
 Shelby County – northwest

City and towns
 Greensburg (city/county seat)
 Millhousen
 New Point
 St. Paul (part)
 Westport

Census-designated places
 Clarksburg
 Lake Santee

Unincorporated places

 Adams
 Alert
 Burney
 Craig
 Downeyville
 Ewington
 Forest Hill
 Gaynorsville
 Germantown
 Harper
 Harris City
 Horace
 Kingston
 Knarr Corner
 Letts
 Letts Corner
 McCoy
 Mechanicsburg
 Milford
 New Pennington
 Pinhook
 Rossburg
 Saint Maurice
 Saint Omer
 Sandusky
 Sardinia
 Slabtown
 Smyrna
 Tarkeo Corner
 Waynesburg
 Williamstown

Townships

 Adams
 Clay
 Clinton
 Fugit
 Jackson
 Marion
 Salt Creek
 Sand Creek
 Washington

Major highways
  Interstate 74
  U.S. Route 421
  Indiana State Road 3
  Indiana State Road 46

Protected areas
 Greenburg Reservoir State Fishing Area

Lakes
 Greenburg Reservoir
 Lake McCoy
 Lake Santee

Climate and weather

Government

The county government is a constitutional body, and is granted specific powers by the Constitution of Indiana, and by the Indiana Code.

County Council: The legislative branch of the county government; controls spending and revenue collection in the county. Representatives are elected to four-year terms from county districts. They set salaries, the annual budget, and special spending. The council has limited authority to impose local taxes, in the form of an income and property tax that is subject to state level approval, excise taxes, and service taxes.

Board of Commissioners: The executive body of the county; commissioners are elected county-wide to staggered four-year terms. One commissioner serves as president. The commissioners execute acts legislated by the council, collect revenue, and manage the county government.

Court: The county maintains a small claims court that handles civil cases. The judge on the court is elected to a term of four years and must be a member of the Indiana Bar Association. The judge is assisted by a constable who is also elected to a four-year term. In some cases, court decisions can be appealed to the state level circuit court.

County Officials: The county has other elected offices, including sheriff, coroner, auditor, treasurer, recorder, surveyor, and circuit court clerk. These officers are elected to four-year terms. Members elected to county government positions are required to declare a party affiliation and to be residents of the county.

Decatur County is part of Indiana's 6th congressional district; Indiana Senate district 42; and Indiana House of Representatives district 67.

Demographics

2010 Census
As of the 2010 United States Census, there were 25,740 people, 9,977 households, and 6,995 families in the county. The racial makeup of the county was 97.3% white, 0.7% Asian, 0.3% black or African American, 0.2% American Indian, 0.6% from other races, and 0.9% from two or more races. Those of Hispanic or Latino origin made up 1.7% of the population. In terms of ancestry, In terms of ancestry, 35.5% were of English ancestry, 35.1% were of German, and 9.0% were of Irish ancestry according to 2010 American Community Survey.

Of the 9,977 households, 33.8% had children under the age of 18 living with them, 54.6% were married couples living together, 10.6% had a female householder with no husband present, 29.9% were non-families, and 25.0% of all households were made up of individuals. The average household size was 2.54 and the average family size was 3.02. The median age was 38.7 years.

The median income for a household in the county was $47,697 and the median income for a family was $52,308. Males had a median income of $41,143 versus $30,226 for females. The per capita income for the county was $22,719. About 8.3% of families and 10.8% of the population were below the poverty line, including 17.3% of those under age 18 and 6.8% of those age 65 or over.

2020 census

See also
 National Register of Historic Places listings in Decatur County, Indiana

References

External links
 Decatur County website

 
Indiana counties
1822 establishments in Indiana
Populated places established in 1822